Four teams that took part at the 1960 Rugby League World Cup.

The Rugby League News listed the squads of the four teams in its October 1960 issue, published after the first round of matches.

Australia 
Keith Barnes led the team as captain/coach. The team was co-managed by Pat Duggan (Ipswich, Qld) and John O'Toole (Bathurst, NSW). 
Beattie, Boden, Kelly, Morgan, Muir, Parcell and Rasmussen were selected from Queensland clubs. Hambly was from a club in the New South Wales Country area. The balance of the squad had played for Sydney based clubs during the 1960 season. 

The following players were members of the touring squad, but did not play in World Cup matches.

Post-Cup Tour Matches 
After the Cup concluded, five Australians  Boden, Muir, Hambly, Beattie and Rayner  played for The Rest in a match against Great Britain at Odsal Stadium, Bradford on October 10, 1960.
Australia then played two matches, against English club St Helens at St. Helen's on October 12, and against a French 13 at Toulouse, on October 16. 
The Rugby League Newspublished the number appearances, tries, goals and points of the Australian players in the January 1961 issue.

France
Coaches: Rene Duffort and Jean Duhau. The team was co-managed by Antoine Blain and the assistant manager was Guy Vassal.

The following players were members of the touring squad, but did not play in World Cup matches.

Great Britain
Coach: Bill Fallowfield

Eric Ashton (captain), goal-kicking three quarter back for Wigan
Billy Boston, right winger for Wigan
Jim Challinor, three quarter back for Warrington
Alan Davies, three quarter back for Oldham
Eric Fraser, full back for Warrington
Bobby Greenhough, utility back for Warrington
Tommy Harris, hooker for Hull
Vince Karalius, forward for St. Helens
Brian McTigue, forward for Wigan
Alex Murphy, scrum half for St. Helens
Frank Myler, stand off for Widnes
Austin Rhodes, utility back for St. Helens
Brian Shaw, forward for Hunslet
Joby Shaw, hooker for Halifax
Mick Sullivan, left winger for Wigan
Derek Turner, forward for Wakefield Trinity
Johnny Whiteley, forward for Hull
Jack Wilkinson, forward for Wakefield Trinity

New Zealand
Coach: Travers Hardwick/Manager: Tom Skinner

Notes

External links
World Cup 1960 at Rugby League Project

1960 in rugby league
Rugby League World Cup squads